John Russell Good (29 January 1933 – 23 March 2005) was an English footballer, who played as a winger in the Football League for Tranmere Rovers.

References

External links

Tranmere Rovers F.C. players
Bury F.C. players
Buxton F.C. players
Association football wingers
English Football League players
Nottingham Forest F.C. players
1933 births
2005 deaths
English footballers